Gedeon Guzina (born 26 December 1993) is a Bosnian  professional footballer who plays as a Centre-Forward for Russian First League club Baltika Kaliningrad.

Guzina started his professional career at Višegrad.

Early Life

He was born on 26 December 1993 on occupied Ilidža during Bosnian War.

Club career

Mladost Doboj Kakanj

In June 2018 he signed for Mladost Doboj Kakanj. He played an excellent season, making thirty appearances with seven goals.

Sarajevo

After a year in Doboj Kakanj, he signed for Sarajevo. He signed a contract for two years. He left the club after half a season.

Istra 1961

In February 2020 he signed for Croatian club Istra 1961.  In the Croatian club, he showed his qualities and became irreplaceable in the first team. After more than a year and a half and great performances for Istra, he left the club for free due to the expiration of his contract.

Radomlje

Not long after the contract with the club from Croatia expired, he settled down in Slovenia, signing for Radomlje. He did not stay long in Slovenia because he left the club after a great season.

Baltika Kaliningrad

In July 2022 he signed for Russian club Baltika from Kaliningrad. He coped perfectly in Russia, he is currently the club's and the league's top scorer.

Career statistics

Club

Honours
Sarajevo
Bosnian Premier League: 2019–20

References

External links

1993 births
Living people
Bosnia and Herzegovina footballers
Association football forwards
FK Tekstilac Derventa players
NK Radomlje players
FC Baltika Kaliningrad players
FK Borac Banja Luka players
NK Zvijezda Gradačac players
FK Mladost Doboj Kakanj players
NK Istra 1961 players
FK Sarajevo players
Premier League of Bosnia and Herzegovina players